NoToDogMeat is a UK-based animal rights charity which supports rescue centres in countries which have a dog meat and cat meat trade. The charity, which is legally known as World Protection for Dogs and Cats in the Meat Trade, also campaigns against the killing of animals in the fur trade. NoToDogMeat operates around the world.

About 

The charity was started by lawyer Julia de Cadenet in 2009. Julia first witnessed the horrors of the live meat markets in China and says that is when she knew she had to act. Julia created the campaign group NoToDogMeat and then started the charity under the formal name World Protection For Dogs and Cats in the Meat Trade. It is under this banner that the charity lobbies both governments and the UN.

As well as continued lobbying, the charity has founded partnership shelters in China to give sanctuary to the dogs and cats they have rescued from the dog meat trade.

Some of the dogs from the rescue centres are rehomed in China, while others travel abroad to find loving homes.

In 2021, the charity expanded its work to Cambodia and partnered with rescuers to open an education centre.

NoToDogMeat also carries out regular awareness campaigns outside the embassies of countries which still have a dog and cat meat trade, and lobbies governments directly for change.

NoToDogMeat is a vegetarian organisation and has thousands of active supporters around the world.

The charity has grassroots supporters around the world who take part in fundraising activities for NoToDogMeat, including the London Marathon.

Campaigns and major publicity 

The NoToDogMeat global campaign began on social media in April 2013, by a like-minded group from the fields of law, veterinary science, journalism and animal rescue – all motivated by their dogs.

The charity World Protection for Dogs and Cats in the Meat Trade (a subsidiary of NoToDogMeat) was legally formed on May 24, 2013 and was placed on the UK Charity Commission register in November.

The charity's aim is to promote enforcement of the 'Universal Five Freedoms of the Sentient Being' for the dogs and cats as defined in Article 7 of the OIE Terrestrial Code.

The charity says it is committed to helping rescuers who stop trucks on the way to the Yulin Dog Meat Festival as well as raiding markets and slaughterhouses.

In January 2018 World Protection for Dogs and Cats in the Meat Trade was recommended for Special Consultative Status.

In June 2020, ahead of the Yulin Dog Meat Festival, NoToDogMeat was the subject of a double page spread in The Daily Star which told the stories of a number of dogs which have been rescued by the charity, including tiny lhasaapso Oliver, who was brought to the shelter close to death but now has a happy life in London.

In the same month Julia de Cadenet explained why the Coronavirus could be good news for dogs destined for slaughter, as it would hopefully stifle the festival and put an end to the circus that surrounds it.

In April 2020 NoToDogMeat responded to news that China was moving to class dogs and cats as unfit for human consumption, amid claims that eating stray animals could be to blame for the Coronavirus pandemic.

The charity took an active role in the pandemic helping out the local community. One heartwarming story was how they helped a disabled lady through Covid shielding by placing one of their rescues with her.

The charity has many supporters around the world including the comedian and animal rights campaigner Ricky Gervais  and the actor Orlando Bloom.

In 2015, a New York Times exposé expressed concerns from campaigners that a Chinese woman named Ms. Yang - who was, at the time, the subject of one of the charity's campaigns - was misappropriating funds, and treating the animals in her care poorly. These claims were backed up by 46 organisations in China including Dr Peter Li, China specialist for HSI.

NoToDogMeat had raised funds for Mrs Yang, but after travelling to see for themselves what was going on, diverted the money to other deserving shelters.

In May 2021 NoToDogMeat broke news that new rules in Yulin around the live slaughter of animals could put an end to the festival for good.

However, NotoToDogMeat campaigners spotted trucks full of dogs headed for the festival in the days leading up to the event.

Inside Yulin the festival was being policed, and no public slaughter was taking place, however dogs were on the menu.

Yulin 
Julia de Cadenet first went to Yulin in 2012 and since then the NoToDogMeat team have been attending on a regular basis and to document the suffering the animals endure in order to push for an end to this cruel event. In 2021 in the midst of the pandemic the team uncovered a dog farm close to Yulin where the carcasses of pregnant dogs and puppies were being sold for £100 each.

The charity is now caring for dogs rescued at their shelter and providing them with all possible support that can be rendered with love.

References

Animal charities based in the United Kingdom
2009 establishments in the United Kingdom
Dog meat
Animal welfare organisations based in the United Kingdom